The Baliung River is a river flowing in southern Java, within the Banten province, Indonesia.

Hydrology
The watershed area of the Baliung River belongs to the Cibaliung–Cisawarna river region, one of the four river region in Banten, and one of the two river area under the authority of Banten province. There are 75 watershed areas in the Cibaliung–Cisawarna river region.

Geography

The river flows in the southwest area of Java with predominantly tropical rainforest climate (designated as Af in the Köppen–Geiger climate classification). The annual average temperature in the area is 23 °C. The warmest month is March, when the average temperature is around 26 °C, and the coldest is May, at 21 °C. The average annual rainfall is 3842 mm. The wettest month is December, with an average of 497 mm rainfall, and the driest is September, with 89 mm rainfall.

See also
List of rivers of Banten
List of rivers of Indonesia
List of rivers of Java

References

Rivers of Banten
Rivers of Indonesia